Robert James Bondurant (born September 8, 1978) is a former racecar driver competing the D1GP and the Formula D circuits as a part of the Drift Avengers. Bondurant has since retired from competition but still maintains an active website. He is also the grandson of legendary racecar driver Bob Bondurant and son of Bobby Bondurant.

During his childhood James used to travel with his grandfather Bob Bondurant and developed a passion for racing, eventually ending up at the Bob Bondurant School of High Performance Driving teaching gokart racing and teaching drifting at the school.

In 2000 he was offered a spot as a part of Team Lexus driving the is400 drift car in d1gp. After failing to place he was let go from the team and picked up as the team captain of the Drift Avengers.

After being suspended from D1GP for multiple violations, James seemed to leave the world of drifting altogether, only to show up for a short time racing sprint cars in the Southern California area for Rudawg Racing.

Retirement
In October 2009 James Bondurant made a post on drifting.com stating that he would retire from racing altogether to focus on other life goals.

In November 2009 Bondurant launched an official website, used for keeping in contact with fans and posts updated information about his life and whereabouts. James Bondurant recently made a post on drifting.com making reference to himself returning to racing in the NASCAR circuit. His official website at this time makes no mention of this and the post has since been removed from drifting.com.

As of 2010 he resides currently in Santa Cruz, California.

References

External links
 

"Factory Five Challenge Series Racing" - Mustangs
 "Intro to Drift #3: How to Drift" - G4
 "NASA 25 Hours of Thunderhill" - NASA
 "2005 FFR Nationals" - Cates Racing
 "2004 NASA 25 Hour Driver" - NASA
 "Formula D Finale" - The Auto Channel

American racing drivers
Living people
1978 births
Place of birth missing (living people)